The Lissauer Breccia, sometimes referred to as the Kocury Locality, is a Norian geologic formation that is part of the larger Keuper limestone, which dominates across most of west and central Europe. Dinosaur remains diagnostic to the genus level are among the fossils that have been recovered from the formation. The site was studied in 1932 and was later forgotten and not explored until excavations began in 2012, and the Lissauer Breccia was re-described in 2021.

Fossil content 
 Kocurypelta silvestris
 cf. Metaceratodus sp.
 Proterochersis cf. porebensis
 Velocipes guerichi

See also 

 List of dinosaur-bearing rock formations
 List of stratigraphic units with few dinosaur genera

References

Bibliography 
 Weishampel, David B.; Dodson, Peter; and Osmólska, Halszka (eds.): The Dinosauria, 2nd, Berkeley: University of California Press. 861 pp. .

Geologic formations of Poland
Triassic System of Europe
Norian Stage
Paleontology in Poland